Harrisoniella is a genus of insects belonging to the family Philopteridae.

The species of this genus are found in Australia and Southernmost America.

Species:

Harrisoniella copei 
Harrisoniella densa 
Harrisoniella ferox 
Harrisoniella hopkinsi

References

Lice
Insect genera